Parliamentary elections were held in Gabon on 15 and 29 December 1996. The result was a victory for the ruling Gabonese Democratic Party, which won 85 of the 120 seats in the National Assembly.

Results

References

Elections in Gabon
Gabon
1996 in Gabon
Election and referendum articles with incomplete results